"Caught by the River" is the third single from English rock band Doves' second studio album, The Last Broadcast (2002). The single was released on 14 October 2002 in the UK and charted at number 29 on the UK Singles Chart. The music video was directed by David Mould.

An unknown quantity of the limited CD version (HVN126CDS, with fold-out poster insert) were mispressed and excluded the enhanced video track (even though the video track is listed on the CD sleeve) and contained only the 3 audio tracks. The B-side "Willow's Song" cuts out the intro and runs for 3:58. The full-length version (which includes a 'false start' and runs 4:20) can be found on the Japanese EP for "Pounding."

Track listings

Charts

References

2002 singles
2002 songs
Doves (band) songs
Heavenly Recordings singles
Songs written by Andy Williams (Doves)
Songs written by Jez Williams
Songs written by Jimi Goodwin